Aunt Clara may refer to:

 Aunt Clara (novel), a 1952 novel by Noel Streatfeild
 Aunt Clara (film), a 1954 film starring Margaret Rutherford, based on the Streatfeild novel
 Aunt Clara, fictional character in the John Steinbeck novel Of Mice and Men  
 Aunt Clara, fictional character on the American TV show Bewitched played by Marion Lorne